Taxi Driver is an ongoing South Korean television series starring Lee Je-hoon, Kim Eui-sung, Pyo Ye-jin, Jang Hyuk-jin, Bae Yoo-ram with Esom in first season and Shin Jae-ha in second season. Based on the webtoon The Deluxe Taxi (Red Cage) by Carlos and Lee Jae-jin. The first season premiered on SBS TV on April 9, 2021, and aired every Friday and Saturday at 22:00 (KST) for 16 episodes. The second season premiered on February 17, 2023, and airs every Friday and Saturday at 22:00 (KST). It is also available for streaming on Kocowa, Netflix, Viki, Viu and Wavve in selected regions.

The series is inspired by actual real life heinous crimes committed in Korea. The series received praise from viewers for its performances and storylines. The finale achieved the fourth highest rating of any Friday-Saturday drama in SBS history.

Series overview

Synopsis
Kim Do-gi (Lee Je-hoon) is a Korea Military Academy graduate whose mother was murdered when he was young. Since he could not take revenge on the man who murdered his mother, he now works as a taxi driver for a company which offers a "revenge-call" service to its clients who have been wronged and helps them take revenge.

Cast

Main
 Lee Je-hoon as Kim Do-gi
 A former 707th Special Mission Group captain who works for Rainbow Taxi Company after his mother was killed.
 Esom as Kang Ha-na (season 1)
 An elite prosecutor from the Seoul Northern District Prosecutors' Office. She fights for justice and later becomes interested in Do-gi's works.
 Kim Eui-sung as Jang Sung-chul
 The CEO of Rainbow Taxi Company. He is also the Director of Blue Bird, a non-profit foundation created to help victims of crime. He is known to be ruthless to villains, and being very warm-hearted towards the victims of crime.
 Pyo Ye-jin as Ahn Go-eun
 A skilled hacker who works for Rainbow Taxi Company after her elder sister commits suicide.
 Jang Hyuk-jin as Choi Kyung-goo
 The lead mechanic of Rainbow Taxi Company. He was a development researcher for new automobiles in an automobile company.
 Bae Yoo-ram as Park Jin-eon
 The assistant mechanic of Rainbow Taxi Company. He was an aircraft maintenance mechanic in a well-known airline company.
 Shin Jae-ha as On Ha-jun (season 2)
 A new driver of Rainbow Taxi Company.

Supporting

 Cha Ji-yeon as Baek Sung-mi
 The chairman of Nakwon C&C. Nicknamed "The Godmother", she is a very notorious and influential figure in the underground economy.
 Yoo Seung-mok as Cho Jin-woo
 The deputy chief prosecutor of the Seoul Northern District Prosecutors' Office.
 Lee Yoo-joon as Wang Min-ho
 A prosecutor from the Seoul Northern District Prosecutors' Office, working in Ha-na's office. He assists Ha-na in her cases.
 Yu Yeon-su as So-eun
 A prosecutor from the Seoul Northern District Prosecutors' Office, working in Ha-na's office.
 Lee Ho-cheol as Goo Seok-tae
 The secretary of Sung-mi.
 Cho Hyun-woo as Cho Do-chul
 A sexual offender who was released from prison early.
 Heo Jung-do as Park Dong-pil
 A police captain from Seoul Jongam Police Station.

 Jeon Jun-ho
 Park Jong-hwan as Park Hyeon-jo
 An executive of Geumsa Organization who keeps an eye on the Rainbow Transport.

Others

Changsung Jeotgal Factory (Ep. 1–2)
 Jo In as Kang Maria
 Rainbow Taxi Company's first requester of the series. She is mentally handicapped and was unknowingly brought to work in the factory.
 Tae Hang-ho as Park Ju-chan
 The general manager of the factory. He resorts to labour exploitation, illegal confinement and habitual abusing of the workers.
 Song Duk-ho as Cho Jong-geun
 Ju-chan's younger brother-in-law.
 Kim Do-yeon as Choi Jong-sook
 The handler who was responsible for bringing Maria to work at the factory.
 Jo Dae-hee as Kim Hyung-wook
 A police chief of a countryside police station. He is corrupt, as he is under the payroll of Ju-chan.
Sejung High School (Ep. 3–4)
 Park Joon-mok as Park Jung-min
 Rainbow Taxi Company's second requester of the series. A sophomore student who has been bullied by Park Seung-tae and his friends frequently.
 Choi Hyun-wook as Park Seung-tae
 A schoolmate of Park Jung-min. He frequently bullies Jung-min.
 Lee Jae-hak as Jang Hyung-sik
 A friend of Seung-tae. He helps Seung-tae in bullying Jung-min.
 Lee Min-jae as Oh Hak-soo
 A friend of Seung-tae. He helps Seung-tae in bullying Jung-min.
U Data (Ep. 5–8)
 Jeon Sung-il as Seo Young-min
 A former U Data employee who was abused by Park Yang-jin. Do-gi personally accepts to seek revenge for him, which is different from the previous two cases.
 Baek Hyun-jin as Park Yang-jin
 The chairman of U Data. He is frequently abusive to his employees whenever something bad happens, and even has resorted to gaslighting them.
 Cho Ha-seok as Director Jung
 Kim Jae-young as Mr. Lee
 A head of department in U Data.
 Lee Da-il as Mr. Ahn
 A department manager in U Data.
 Kwak Min-gyu as Jeon Jin-won
 A former U Data employee.
 Ryu Yi-jae as Ahn Jung-eun
 Go-eun's elder sister who has passed away.
 Seo Han-gyeol as Choi Min
 Jung-eun's boyfriend.
Voice Phishing Organisation (Ep. 9–10)
 Shim So-young as Lim Bok-ja
 The boss of a voice phishing organisation, located within a Chinese food restaurant.
 Kim Dae-gon as Madame Lim's employee (Ep. 9–10)
Nakwon C&C/Embassy of Bahamas (Ep. 11–14)
 Lee Ho-cheol as Goo Young-tae
 Seok-tae's twin brother, and the junior managing director of Nakwon C&C.
 Jung Kang-hee as Shim Woo-seob
 Han Kyu-won as Go Dong-hee
 Han Hyun-ah as Lee Hye-yeon
 Dong-hee's girlfriend.
 Lee Yoon-hee as Pastor Go
 Dong-hee's father.
 Lee Ha-eun as Dong-hee's younger sister
Finale (Ep. 15–16)
 Yang Dong-tak as Oh Chul-young
 A serial killer who murdered Sung-chul's parents and Do-gi's mother.
 Jeon Seok-chan as Kim Chul-jin
 A man who was wrongfully jailed 20 years behind bars for a murder case, which was actually committed by Chul-young.
 Ryu Sung-rok as Han Dong-chan / Oh Hyun-soo
 The son of Chul-young and a prison guard.

Vietnam Kidnap Group (Ep. 1–2)
 Choi One as Lee Joon-beom  
 Rainbow Taxi Company's first requester of Season 2. He was searching for his missing son, Lee Dong-jae, for the past year.
 Zo Zee-an as Lee Dong-jae 
 A missing young man suspected to be a victim of crime.
 Yoon Seok-hyun as Sang-man
 The manager of Cheongeum International.
 Kim Jeong-hoon as a tour guide
 Lee Kyu-ho as Kwon Du-sik
 The boss of Cheongeum International's illegal gambling sites department.
 Park Seong-geun as Kim Hyung-sub  
 The head of the Seoul Northeast Police Station's violent team and the chairman of Cheongeum International.
Yongsori Village (Ep. 3–4)
 Byun Joong-hee as Lee Im-soon
 Rainbow Taxi Company's second requester of Season 2. She was the victim of a previous scam operation by Yoo Sang-gi.
 Ko Sang-ho as Yoo Sang-gi
 A professional scammer who mainly targets on the elderly. He purchased spoilt devices, and resold them as usable devices in order to scam victims.
 Kang Young-taek as Lee Dong-geun
 A gang member who works under Sang-gi.
 Yoo Dong-hoon as Goo Jae-seung
 A gang member who works under Sang-gi.
 Lee Kwang-hoon as Yong-chil
 A phone seller who worked together with Sang-gi.
 Shin Kang-gyun as Lee Deok-goo
 An elderly man staying in Yongsori Village who almost became a victim of Sang-gi's scam operation.
Feel Consulting (Ep. 5–6)
 Ahn Chae-heum as Hwang Seo-yeon
 Rainbow Taxi Company's third requester of Season 2. She was a victim of child abuse.
 Kim Do-yoon as Kang Pil-seung 
 Nicknamed Kang Pro, he is Feel Consulting's representative. He has Mysophobia.
 Kwon Na-hyun as Park So-mang
 Seo-yeon's adoptive younger sister.
 Jeong Young-gi as Park Joon-bin
 Feel Consulting's lead manager.
Soonbaek Cult (Ep. 7–8)
 Kim Eun-bi as Lee Jin-hee 
 Rainbow Taxi Company's fourth requester of Season 2. She was searching for her older sister, Lee Jin-seon, who has fallen into a cult.
 Ahn Sung-woo as Ok Joo-man
 A pastor and leader of the cult pseudo-churches that are committing crimes.
 Jung Ji-woo as Lee Jin-seon 
 Jin-hee's sister who is a victim of a pseudo-church.
 Seo Ji-soo as Joo-man's lover  
 Jaeil Hospital (Ep. 9–10)
 Lee Hang-na as Ahn Young-sook
 The chief director of Jaeil Hospital.

Special appearances

 Yoon Do-hyun as Driver Yoon (Ep. 1)
 Lee Young-ae (voice appearance)
 Park Geun-hyung as Sung-mi's husband (Ep. 13)
 Park Jin-hee as Do Joong-won (Ep. 16)
 Jin-woo's replacement as deputy chief prosecutor of the Seoul Northern District Prosecutors' Office.
 Ryu Hyun-kyung as Baek Kyung-mi (Ep. 16)
 Sung-mi's younger sister.
 Yoon Sung-yeo as himself (Ep. 15)
 A real-life suspect of the Hwaseong serial murders who was wrongfully convicted of and sentenced to life imprisonment for one of the murders

 Lee Young-ae (voice appearance)
 Shim So-young as Lim Bok-ja (Ep. 1-2)
 Namkoong Min as Chun Ji-hoon (Ep. 9)

Production

Season 1

Development
On December 4, 2019, it was reported that SBS was considering adapting the webtoon The Deluxe Taxi by Carlos and Lee Jae-jin into a television series. Korean streaming platform Wavve was also invested in the series, has also reported that it has previously invested in several other series such as Zombie Detective (2020), Bossam: Steal the Fate (2021), Alice (2020).

Casting
On November 20, 2020, Lee Je-hoon, Esom, Kim Eui-sung and Lee Na-eun were confirmed to star in the series. On March 8, 2021, Lee Na-eun officially left the cast following bullying accusations made against her. Two days later, it was announced that Pyo Ye-jin would replace Lee Na-eun.

Filming
As of March 8, 2021, about 60% of filming was complete, though scenes featuring Lee Na-eun were scheduled to be re-shot following her removal from the cast.

Season 2
On July 6, 2021, SBS announced the production of second season. On March 8, 2022, it was reported that Esom will be withdrawing from Season 2 due to scheduling inconsistencies.

On June 8, 2022, it was confirmed that Lee Je-hoon and Pyo Ye-jin will reprise their respective roles in Season 2, and a script reading will take place on the June 12, 2022. Season 2 is expected to air in 2023.  A day later, Kim Eui-sung, Jang Hyuk-jin and Bae Yoo-ram also confirmed to reprise their roles.

Filming 
On July 15, 2022, it was confirmed by SBS that some of the staff had tested positive for COVID-19, causing filming in Vietnam to temporarily halt.

Release
The first teaser video and teaser poster were released on December 31, 2020.

To promote the second season of the K-drama, Viu, which they brought Season 2 as part of 'Viu Original' lineups, will invite Lee Je-hoon for his first ever fan-meeting at the Philippines on March 3, 2023, at Jakarta, Indonesia on March 19, 2023 and in Singapore on March 25, 2023. Lee was also participate FilMart in Hong Kong, where Viu unveiled Season 2 of the series became the most watched following the premiere.

Original soundtrack

Season 1

Part 1

Part 2

Part 3

Part 4

Part 5

Part 6

Part 7

Season 2

Part 1

Part 2

Part 3

Part 4

Part 5

Viewership

Season 1

Season 2

Awards and nominations

Notes

References

External links
  
  
 
 
 
 
 Taxi Driver at Studio S 
 Taxi Driver at Creative Leaders Group Eight 
 Taxi Driver at Line Webtoon 
 Taxi Driver at Tapas 

Webtoons
Tapastic webcomics
Seoul Broadcasting System television dramas
Korean-language television shows
2021 South Korean television series debuts
South Korean action television series
South Korean crime television series
Works about taxis
Television series about revenge
Television shows based on South Korean webtoons
Television series by Studio S

Wavve original programming
Korean-language Viu (streaming media) exclusive international distribution programming